Andrew Reynolds Smith (born May 1966) is a British business executive. He was the chief executive officer (CEO) of Smiths Group from September 2015 to May 2021. He succeeded Philip Bowman, who retired after eight years in charge.

Early life
Andrew Reynolds Smith was born in May 1966. He worked as an apprentice at Texas Instruments. He has a PhD in mechanical engineering.
In his late teens he was an avid cyclist, competing in tournaments across Europe.  He grew up sailing in southwest England.

Career
Smith joined GKN in 2002, rising to CEO of GKN Automotive. He became a main board director in June 2007.

Other roles
Reynolds Smith is a former chairman of the CBI Manufacturing Council, and a former member of the Ministerial Advisory Group for Manufacturing. He is a former non-executive director of Morgan Advanced Materials.

He is a supporter of the Macmillan cancer research charity.

References

1966 births
British chief executives
Living people
Place of birth missing (living people)
People from Cornwall